Dixiana was an American country music band. Founded in 1986, the band was composed of five members: brothers Mark (bass guitar, vocals) and Phil Lister (guitar, vocals), Randall Griffith (keyboards), Colonel Shuford (drums), and Cindy Murphy (lead vocals).

Signed to Epic Records in 1992, they released their self-titled debut album that year. It produced three singles, two of which charted on the Billboard Hot Country Singles & Tracks (now Hot Country Songs) charts. The album received a C− rating from Entertainment Weekly, who described it as "generic country-pop" but highlighted lead vocalist Murphy as a "strong suit". A fourth single, "Now You're Talkin'", was released in 1993. Joseph Stanley of Cash Box praised it as a "fresh and fun cut".

Mark and Phil Lister have since co-founded a recording studio called Dixiana Music.

Discography

Dixiana

The Band

Additional Musicians

Production

Track information and credits verified from the album's liner notes.

Charts

Singles

Music videos

References

Country music groups from Tennessee
Musical groups established in 1986
Epic Records artists
1986 establishments in Tennessee